The 2019 FIBA Basketball World Cup qualification was the first World Cup for which teams had to qualify for under the new qualification system. The process determined 31 out of the 32 teams that participated at the 2019 FIBA Basketball World Cup.

Qualified teams

Format
The continental championships no longer belong to the qualification system for the World Cup. Instead, two rounds of continental qualifying tournaments were held over two years in a home-and-away format.

The first round of the qualifiers were held in late 2017 and early 2018. The Americas, Asia / Oceania and Africa qualifiers featured 16 teams each, whereas Europe had 32 teams. Division A teams was split in groups of four, to be held in a home-and-away round-robin. The top three teams in each groups advanced to round two, and last placed teams played the best Division B teams to qualify for the next season's Division A.

Round two of the World Cup qualifiers were held in late 2018 and early 2019. Teams were split in groups of six, totaling four groups in Europe and two in the other qualifiers. Teams carried over the points from round one, and face another three teams again in a home-and-away round-robin. The best teams in each group qualified for the World Cup.

Starting in 2019, no wild card qualification were held, and the Olympic champions no longer directly qualified to the World Cup.

The draw for the qualifiers was held on 7 May 2017 in Guangzhou, China.

Confederation qualifications

FIBA Africa

First round

Group A

Group B

Group C

Group D

Second round

Group E

Group F

Best third placed team

FIBA Americas

First round

Group A

Group B

Group C

Group D

Second round

Group E

Group F

Best fourth placed team

FIBA Asia and FIBA Oceania

All 16 teams which qualified for the 2017 FIBA Asia Cup played in the Asian qualification round of the 2019 FIBA World Cup, which included teams from FIBA Oceania.

First round

Group A

Group B

Australia defeated Philippines by default following a brawl left Philippines with only 1 player on court

Group C

Group D

Second round

Group E

Group F

Best fourth placed team

FIBA Europe

Pre-qualified teams (24 of 32 Teams)

European Pre-Qualifiers
The 24 national teams that qualified for EuroBasket 2017 had also qualified for Division A of FIBA Basketball World Cup Qualifying. The last eight teams qualified through the FIBA Basketball World Cup 2019 European Pre-Qualifiers which were held in August 2017.

In order to determine the last eight spots in Division A, 13 teams participated in four home-and-away round robin groups on 2 to 19 August 2017. The draw to determine the 4 groups was held in Prague, Czech Republic on 10 December 2016.

Group A

Group B

Group C

Group D

First round

Group A

Group B

Group C

Group D

Group E

Group F

Group G

Group H

Second round

Group I

Group J

Group K

Group L

Issues and concerns
There were concerns from national federations that they would not be able to play the qualifiers with players from top professional leagues globally (the National Basketball Association and EuroLeague), which is possible with professional leagues operating in mid-year.

References

External links
 
 

qualification
FIBA
2017 in basketball
2018 in basketball
2019 in basketball